We'll Knock The Heligo—Into Heligo—Out Of Heligoland! is a World War I song written by John J. O'Brian and composed by Theodore Morse. The song was first published in 1917 by Leo Feist Inc., in New York, NY. The sheet music cover depicts a terrified Kaiser standing on a cliff with a city below and United States soldiers rushing toward him.

The sheet music can be found at the Pritzker Military Museum & Library.

References

Bibliography
Parker, Bernard S. World War I Sheet Music 1. Jefferson: McFarland & Company, Inc., 2007. . 
Paas, John Roger. 2014. America sings of war: American sheet music from World War I. . 
Vogel, Frederick G. World War I Songs: A History and Dictionary of Popular American Patriotic Tunes, with Over 300 Complete Lyrics. Jefferson: McFarland & Company, Inc., 1995. . 

1917 songs
Songs of World War I
Songs with music by Theodore F. Morse